The Washington Masquerade is a 1932 American Pre-Code drama film directed by Charles Brabin and written by John Meehan and Samuel Blythe. The film stars Lionel Barrymore, Karen Morley, Diane Sinclair, Nils Asther and Reginald Barlow. The film was released on July 9, 1932, by Metro-Goldwyn-Mayer.

Plot 
After successfully freeing a wrongfully convicted boy from prison, attorney Jeff Keane is nominated and elected to the United States Senate. Although Keane had been aloof from politics, his crusade against big business becomes popular yet controversial. At a White House gala, Keane meets Consuela Fairbanks, a socialite whom he eventually marries despite his daughter Ruth's protestations.

After the marriage, Consuela confesses that she is heavily in debt and urges Jeff to resign and join lobbyist Alan Hinsdale's law firm. After discovering that Hinsdale is corrupt and that Consuela is having an affair with her former lover Henri Brenner, Jeff and Ruth open a Senate investigation of Hinsdale and his colleague Senator Bitler.

At an emotional testimony, an exhausted Jeff confesses to bribery during his dealings with Hinsdale but exposes the scandal for prosecution by the United States Attorney General. The stress causes Jeff to die of a heart attack at the end of his speech, and Stapleton later notes that "he loved his country enough to die for it."

Cast 
 Lionel Barrymore as Jeff Keane
 Karen Morley as Consuela Fairbanks
 Diane Sinclair as Ruth Keane
 Nils Asther as Brenner
 Reginald Barlow as Senator Withers
 William Collier, Sr. as Babcock
 William Morris as	Senator Hodge
 Rafaela Ottiano as Mona
 C. Henry Gordon as Hinsdale
 Berton Churchill as Senator Bitler 
 Henry Kolker as Stapleton

References

External links 
 
 
 
 

1932 films
American drama films
1932 drama films
Metro-Goldwyn-Mayer films
Films directed by Charles Brabin
American black-and-white films
American films based on plays
Films set in Washington, D.C.
Films set in the White House
Films about corruption in the United States
1930s English-language films
1930s American films